Golden Era Mixtape 2013 is a mixtape by all artists signed to Australian hip hop label Golden Era Records. As was the case with the Golden Era mixtapes that were released prior to 2013, the Golden Era Mixtape 2013 is publicly available as a free download.

Details
The 2013 mixtape is hosted by Vents, a Golden Era artist from Adelaide, Australia, with support from mixer/DJ Jaytee. The final track on the mixtape "Cypher" is a collaboration that features the entire Golden Era roster and serves as an introduction for 2013 signing K21.

Track listing

References

External links 
 Official website

2013 mixtape albums
Record label compilation albums
Golden Era Records albums